Environmental journalism – collection, verification, production, distribution and exhibition of information regarding current events, trends, issues and people that are associated with the non-human world. It is closely related to, and probably grew from, nature writing and environmental communication. Key points environmental journalism focuses on are global warming and ecology.

The best environmental reports of 2019 
In years, there have been written a lot of articles about the environment, but you must get tired if you read them all. This are the one's you should read for sure.

Essence
 Nature writing
 Environmental communication
 Ecology

Branches

 Nature writing
 Science writing
 Environmental literature

Common topics
 Agriculture
 Air Pollution
 Biodiversity
 Cancer
 Chemical weapons
 Children's Health (Asthma)
 Dioxins and dioxin-like compounds
 Ecosystems
 Endocrine Disruptors
 Environmental Justice
 Food irradiation
 Genetically Modified Crops
 Global Warming / Climate Change
 Natural disaster
 Occupational Health
 Ozone
 Pesticides
 Population growth
 Sprawl / Environmental Health
 Water resources.

History

General concepts

 Environmentalism
 Conservation (Closely tied with Environmentalism)
 Environmental accounting

Notable people

 Rachel Carson

Environmental
 List of environmental topics
 List of environmental periodicals
 List of environmental publications

See also

 Journalism
 Heritage interpretation
 :Category:Natural environment

External links
 Society of Environmental Journalists
 EARTH Journalism Network
 Knight Center for Environmental Journalism at Michigan State University
 Center for Environmental Journalism at Colorado State University
 https://www.iberdrola.com/culture/environmental-journalism 

Outlines of society
Wikipedia outlines
Environmental mass media
Journalism